The League of Extraordinary Gentlemen (LoEG) is a comic book series (inspired by the 1960 British film The League of Gentlemen) co-created by writer Alan Moore and artist Kevin O'Neill which began in 1999. The series spans four volumes, an original graphic novel, and a spin-off trilogy of graphic novella. Volume I and Volume II (released as two six-issue limited series) and the graphic novel Black Dossier were published by the America's Best Comics imprint of DC Comics. After leaving the America's Best imprint, the series moved to Top Shelf and Knockabout Comics, which published Volume III: Century (released as three graphic novella), the Nemo Trilogy (a spin-off of three graphic novella centered on the character of Nemo), and Volume IV: The Tempest (originally released as a six-issue limited series). According to Moore, the concept behind the series was initially a "Justice League of Victorian England" but he quickly developed it as an opportunity to merge elements from many works of fiction into one world.

Elements of Volume I were used in a loosely adapted feature film of the same name, released in 2003 and starring Sean Connery in his last live-action role.

Plot

The year is 1898, and Mina Murray is recruited by Campion Bond on behalf of British Intelligence and asked to assemble a league of other extraordinary individuals to protect the interests of the Empire: Captain Nemo, Allan Quatermain, Dr. Jekyll, and Hawley Griffin the Invisible Man. They help stop a gang war between Fu Manchu and Professor Moriarty, nemesis of Sherlock Holmes. Following this they take part in the events of H. G. Wells's The War of the Worlds. Two members of the League (Mina Murray and Allan Quatermain) achieve immortality, and are next seen in an adventure in 1958. This follows events that take place after the fall of the Big Brother government from Nineteen Eighty Four.

Following this, Mina and Allan team up with fellow immortal Orlando and are shown in an adventure which spans a century, from 1910 to 2009, concerning a plot by evil magicians to create a Moonchild that might well turn out to be the Antichrist. During this adventure Captain Nemo's daughter, Janni Dakkar, is introduced, and some of her adventures are chronicled subsequently. The final volume of the series ends with an immortal Mina escaping an earth dominated by magical entities and various alien invasions to live out her immortal life on a space station with Orlando, Jack Nemo (great-grandson of Captain Nemo) and a clone of Mr. Hyde.

Characters

The League of Extraordinary Gentlemen

 Wilhelmina "Mina" Murray
 Allan Quatermain / Allan Quatermain, Jr.
 Prince Dakkar / Captain Nemo I
 Dr. Henry Jekyll / Edward Hyde
 Hawley Griffin / Invisible Man I
 Orlando / Roland
 Thomas Carnacki
 A. J. Raffles
 Emma Night

Nemo trilogy

 Janni Dakkar / Jenni Diver / Captain Nemo II
 John "Broad Arrow Jack" Ashleigh
 Ishmael
 Professor Augustus S. F. X. Van Dusen
 Hira Dakkar
 Tobias Ishmael
 Luala Ishmael
 Armand Robur
 Cú Chulainn / Hugo Hercules / Hugo Coghlan
 Jack Dakkar / Captain Nemo III
 Tacarigua Ishmael

Overview of the series
In a 1997 interview with Andy Diggle for the now defunct Comics World website, Alan Moore gave the title of the work as "The League of Extraordinary Gentlefolk". Moore changed the name to Gentlemen to better reflect the Victorian era. Simon Bisley was originally going to be the artist for the series before being replaced by Kevin O'Neill.

The Victorian setting allowed Moore and O'Neill to insert "in-jokes" and cameos from many works of Victorian fiction, while also making contemporary references and jibes. The works bear numerous steampunk influences. In the first issue, for example, there is a half-finished bridge to link Britain and France, referencing problems constructing the Channel Tunnel.

Most characters in the series, from the dominatrix schoolmistress Rosa Coote to minor characters such as Inspector Dick Donovan, are either established characters from existing works of fiction or ancestors of the same, to the extent that individuals depicted in crowd scenes in Volume I have been said (both by Moore, and in annotations by Jess Nevins) to be visually designed as the ancestors of the cast of EastEnders. This has lent the series considerable popularity with fans of esoteric Victoriana, who have delighted in attempting to place every character who makes an appearance.

Moore said:

Publisher change

Moore's longstanding, outspoken criticism of DC Comics (stemming in large part from what he perceives as mistreatment at their hands over the rights to Watchmen) made his position with DC-owned subsidiary Wildstorm Comics (of which LoEG publisher America's Best Comics is an imprint) tenuous from the start. Moore's initial agreement was with WildStorm owner Jim Lee, who sold his studio to DC after dealing with Moore, but before any of the ABC projects were published. Moore agreed to honor his contracts with Lee, but made it clear that he wished to continue to have no dealings with DC directly.

The fifth issue of the first volume contained an authentic vintage advertisement for a douche with the brand name Marvel Douche. The entire initial print run was destroyed and reprinted because the publisher felt that this could be perceived as an attack on Marvel Comics, DC's main competition.

After several additional complaints over DC interference, Moore decided to wind up his ABC projects, intending to only continue with League (the only title he, with O'Neill, actually owned). He subsequently took offense at inaccurate comments made by the producer of the film version of his V for Vendetta, which stated that the author—who had distanced himself completely from film adaptations of his work, particularly after LXG—had commented favorably on a draft of the script. Moore requested that someone involved with the film's production company—and DC Comics parent company, Warner Bros.—officially retract the comments and apologize. He also claims that his lack of support from DC regarding a minor lawsuit related to the film adaptation of The League of Extraordinary Gentlemen was instrumental in his departure.

When no such apology was forthcoming, both Moore and O'Neill decided to withdraw future volumes of the League from DC in protest. Since the duo was still working on the Black Dossier at the time, it was agreed that it would become the last League project published by DC/WildStorm, with subsequent projects published jointly by Top Shelf Productions and Knockabout Comics in the US and UK respectively, who published both Volume III: Century, and the Nemo Trilogy, as graphic novella trilogies. Top Shelf and Knockabout later released Volume IV: The Tempest first as a six-issue limited series. Reprints of Volumes I-II and the Dossier were published by Vertigo until its shutdown in January 2020.

World of the League
Volume II has an extensive appendix, most of which is filled with an imaginary travelers' account of the alternate universe the League is set in, called The New Traveler's Almanac. This Almanac provides background information — much of which is taken from the pre-existing literary works or mythology and may be difficult to fully appreciate without an esoteric knowledge of literature. It shows the plot of the comic to be just a small section of a world inhabited by what appears to be the entirety of fiction.

History of the League

Moore's work includes references to previous leagues and suggests there will be others subsequently. In much the same way that the New Traveller's Almanac, an appendix to the trade paperback collection of The League Vol. 2, detailed much of the geography of the League's world, the third volume, The Black Dossier, set out an extensive history of the world of the League and each of its various incarnations, threading together hundreds of disparate works of fiction into a cohesive timeline.

Awards and recognition
The League of Extraordinary Gentlemen won the 1999 National Comics Award for Best New Comic (International).

Volume I won the 2000 Bram Stoker Award for Best Illustrated Narrative. 

Volume II was nominated for the 2003 award, but lost to The Sandman: Endless Nights. Volume II received the 2003 Eisner Award for Best Finite Series/Limited Series. Time Magazine listed Volume II as the 9th best comic of 2003. It was included in the 2005 edition of The Year's Best Graphic Novels, Comics, & Manga. Time also listed Black Dossier as the second-best comic of 2007.

Influence

Music
The steampunk band Unextraordinary Gentlemen was inspired by this comic.

On "75 Bars (Black's Reconstruction)" off the Rising Down album, Black Thought refers to The Roots as "gentlemen of an extraordinary league".

Books
A chapter in the 2005 nonfiction work The Cult of Alien Gods: H. P. Lovecraft and Extraterrestrial Pop Culture is titled "The League of Extraordinary Gentlemen".

In his 2005 book The Areas of My Expertise, John Hodgman refers to Nemo as "the Sikh" and "the Science-Pirate", as Nemo was referred to in the League comics.

Neil Gaiman cited The League of Extraordinary Gentlemen as one of the influences for his award-winning short story "A Study in Emerald".

Comics
Warren Ellis has cited The League of Extraordinary Gentlemen as an inspiration for his comic Ignition City.

The comic  by science-fiction writer Serge Lehman has been regarded by critics as the French reply to The League. It uses proto-superhumans and supervillains from European pulp literature of the early twentieth century, but in a whole different perspective as Lehman is not mainly focused on English literature (as Moore does), mixes those real fictional characters equally with real prominent historical figures and builds a crepuscular alternate history story whose aim is to explain on a historical and psychoanalytical level why all European super-heroes disappeared from popular culture and European collective memory with World War II.

Annotations
Jess Nevins has produced a series of annotations for each volume which are available online and have also been expanded into book form:
 
 Heroes & Monsters (UK) (Titan Books, 2006), 
 A Blazing World: The Unofficial Companion to the Second League of Extraordinary Gentlemen (MonkeyBrain Books, 2004) 
 A Blazing World (UK) (Titan Books, 2006) 
 Impossible Territories: An Unofficial Companion to the League of Extraordinary Gentlemen The Black Dossier (MonkeyBrain Books, 2008)

In other media

Film
A film adaptation was released in 2003, also by the name The League of Extraordinary Gentlemen. The film stars Sean Connery, who plays Allan Quatermain, and features Captain Nemo, Mina Harker, Rodney Skinner aka An Invisible Man (the film rights could not be secured to The Invisible Man), Dr. Jekyll and Edward Hyde, Dorian Gray, and U.S. Secret Service agent Tom Sawyer. Though Gray and Sawyer were not featured in the comics, a painting of a young man holding a cane with "Dorian Gray" printed under it appears on the cover of Volume I.

In May 2015, 20th Century Fox announced that a reboot is being developed. John Davis said that the reboot will be a female-centric film. As of May 2022, the film is on track by 20th Century Studios, scheduled to stream on Hulu, with Justin Haythe writing and Don Murphy, who produced the 2003 film, will return as a producer alongside Susan Montford and Erwin Stoff of 3 Arts Entertainment.

TV series
In 2013, Fox was ordering a pilot for the television version of LoEG with Michael Green serving as writer and executive producer. Erwin Stoff would also executive produce. Neither Moore nor O'Neill are producers on the series. It had also been reported that the pilot episode would still be broadcast, even if Fox opted not to green-light the series.

Interviews
The DVD of the documentary feature film The Mindscape of Alan Moore contains an interview with the artist Kevin O'Neill, elaborately detailing the collaboration with Alan Moore. O'Neill talks about League of Extraordinary Gentlemen: Century and his run-ins with censorship.

See also
 History of The League of Extraordinary Gentlemen
 List of The League of Extraordinary Gentlemen characters
 Philip José Farmer's Wold Newton family
 Kim Newman's Anno Dracula novels
 Penny Dreadful

References

External links

 Annotations to the League,  (Jess Nevins's annotations to Volumes 1 and 2, The Black Dossier and Century: 1910)
 Annotations to Century: 1969
 Annotations to Century: 2009
 Annotations to Nemo: Heart of Ice
 Annotations to Nemo: The Roses of Berlin
 Annotations to Nemo: River of Ghosts
 

 
Steampunk comics
Alternate history comics
Crossover comics
Experimental medical treatments in fiction
American comics adapted into films
1999 comics debuts
Comics characters introduced in 1999
Comics set in the 19th century
Comics set in the 1950s
Comics based on Dracula
Comics based on works by Jules Verne
Adaptations of works by H. G. Wells
Works based on Sherlock Holmes
Works based on literary characters
Works based on Moby-Dick
Adaptations of works by Robert Louis Stevenson
Comics set in London